The  was a senior office in the Venetian navy and in the Venetian overseas empire.

History and functions
The  was the supreme commander of the Venetian fleet in peacetime. The office usually had a tenure of three years, but in wartime, the nomination of a new  was usually accompanied also by the election of a new . From the first half of the 16th century, he also appears as the governor of the Venetian Ionian Islands.

Typically he hoisted his ensign on a bastard galley, although in later times he was allowed to use a sailing ship of the line instead. As a sign of his command, the poop deck of his vessel bore three lanterns.

The office was abolished after the Fall of the Republic of Venice and the start of French rule in the Ionian Islands in June 1797.

Catalogue of 

 Giacomo Corner, 1684-1687
 Andrea Navagier, 1687-1690
 Vicenzo Vendramin, 1690-1693
 Antonio Molin, 1693-1696
 Bortolo Contarini, 1696-1701
 Francesco Grimani, 1701-1704
 Francesco Grimani, 1705-1708
 Alvise Mocenigo, 1708-1711
 Agostin Sagredo, 1711-1714
 , 1714-1715
 Andrea Pisani, 1715-1718
 Antonio Loredan, 1716-1718
 Zorzi Pasqualigo, 1718-1721
 Andrea Corner, 1721-1724
 Francesco Corner, 1724-1728
 Marcantonio Diedo, 1728-1731
 Nicolò Erizzo, 1731-1734
 Pietro Vendramin, 1734-1737
 Zorzi Grimani, 1737-1740
 Antonio Loredan, 1740-1743
 Daniele IX Dolfin, 1743-1746
 Antonio Marin Cavalli, 1746-1749
 Giovanni Battista Vitturi, 1749-1752
 Agostin Sagredo, 1752-1755
 Gerolamo Querini, 1755-1758
 Francesco Grimani, 1758-1761
 Alvise III Contarini, 1761-1764
 Antonio Marin Priuli, 1764-1767
 Andrea Donà, 1767-1770
 Pietro Querini, 1770-1773
 Antonio Renier, 1773-1776
 Giacomo Nani, 1776-1779
 , 1779-1782
 Alvise Foscari, 1782-1783
 Nicolò Erizzo, 1784-1786
 Francesco Falier, 1787-1791
 Angelo IV Memmo, 1791-1794
 Carlo Aurelio Widmann, 1794-1797

Gallery

References

Sources
 
 
 
 

Military ranks of the Venetian navy
Republic of Venice admirals
Venetian rule in the Ionian Islands
Stato da Màr
1797 disestablishments
Venetian governors